Nargess may refer to:

Nargess (film), a 1992 Iranian feature film by Rakhshan Bani-Etemad
Nargess (TV series), an Iranian soap opera television series
Nargess (given name)

See also
Cyclone Nargis, 2008